Honesto is a 2013 Philippine family drama television series directed by Jerry Lopez Sineneng and Darnel Joy Villaflor, starring Raikko Mateo as Honesto, a young boy whose nose gets big whenever he lies. The series was aired on ABS-CBN's Primetime Bida evening block and worldwide on The Filipino Channel from October 28, 2013 to March 14, 2014, replacing Juan dela Cruz, and was replaced by Dyesebel.

Cast and characters

Main cast
 Raikko Mateo as Honesto Galang/ Honesto L. Layer
 Paulo Avelino as Diego Layer

Supporting cast
 Eddie Garcia as Lemuel Galang
 Janice de Belen as Lourdes Galang
 Joel Torre as Hugo Layer
 Angel Aquino as Magdalena "Lena" Layer†
 Nonie Buencamino as Cleto
 Cristine Reyes as Nurse Marie Olivarez
 Melissa Ricks as Leah Layer
 Joseph Marco as Elijah "Elai" Galang

Recurring cast
 Jason Francisco as Omar Batungbakal
 Melai Cantiveros as Cleopatra Batungbakal
 Malou Crisologo as Minerva
 Jana Agoncillo as Abby Layer
 Allan Paule as Rolando "Rolly" Jimenez
 Josh Ivan Morales as Conrad
 Michael Conan as Joel
 Marco Antonio Masa as Wacky
 Jan Marini as Rebecca
 Biboy Ramirez as Willy
 Bing Davao as Dr. Perez
 Nanding Josef as Fr. Anton
 Erin Ocampo as Alexa
 Eileen Gonzales as Irene

Guest cast
 Kathleen Hermosa as Inna
 Lui Villaruz as Pablo
 Beauty Gonzalez as Emily
 Johan Santos as Jacob
 Hermie Concepcion as Lidia
Kristoffer Calderon as Aaron#bully
Charls Deomampo as Chubby#bully
 Ricardo Cepeda as Anuncio
 Helga Krapf as Fiona
 Vangie Martelle as Natasha
 William Lorenzo as Ricky
 Gio Alvarez as Benjie
 Meryll Soriano as Elsa
 Larah Claire Sabroso as Rose
 Ron Morales as Gerald Pascual
 Melissa Mendez Mrs. Pascual
 Shey Bustamante as Grace Pascual
 Young JV as Greg Pascual
 Jobelle Salvador
 Dianne Medina as Tanya
 Allyson McBride as Christine
 CX Navarro

Special participation
 Gina Pareño as Rosita Layer†
 Spanky Manikan as Felipe Lualhati
 Maricar Reyes as Josefina "Fina" Lualhati†
 Carl John Barrameda as young Diego
 Alexa Ilacad as Young Marie

Notes
 Angel Aquino exits Honesto so that she could join the cast of Ikaw Lamang as Rebecca Miravelez.
 There are many characters in Honesto that are in Ikaw Lamang, like: Angel Aquino, Joel Torre, Nonie Buencamino, Jana Agoncillo and Spanky Manikan.
 Maricar Reyes and Paulo Avelino reunited in Sana Bukas pa ang Kahapon.

Reception
Based on the data from Kantar Media, the pilot episode of Honesto garnered 30.5% national TV ratings compared to its rival program Genesis of GMA Network which only scored 10.5%.

Awards

See also
List of programs broadcast by ABS-CBN
List of ABS-CBN drama series

References

ABS-CBN drama series
2013 Philippine television series debuts
2014 Philippine television series endings
Fantaserye and telefantasya
Television series by Dreamscape Entertainment Television
Filipino-language television shows
Television shows set in the Philippines
2010s children's television series